Cathryn Molloy (born 11 May 1955) is a former Australian politician. She was a Labor and independent member of the Legislative Assembly of Queensland from 2001 to 2006, representing the district of Noosa.

Molloy first entered Queensland state parliament as one of a number of newly elected Labor MPs following the party's landslide win at the 2001 state election. She was subsequently re-elected at the 2004 state election.

In 2006, Molloy publicly opposed her party's policy to build a dam on the Mary River. This stance resulted in her disendorsement as a Labor Party candidate in June 2006. She continued to sit as a Labor MP before quitting the party in August 2006. Thereafter, Molloy sat out the remainder of her term as an independent before being defeated at the 2006 state election. The following year, Molloy unsuccessfully contested the federal seat of Wide Bay, also in an independent capacity. In the 2009 state election, she unsuccessfully re-contested Noosa.

Molloy was born in East Melbourne, Victoria. She was married to Ivan Molloy, who was the endorsed Labor candidate for Fairfax at the 2004 federal election.

References

1955 births
Living people
Independent members of the Parliament of Queensland
Members of the Queensland Legislative Assembly
Australian Labor Party members of the Parliament of Queensland
21st-century Australian politicians
21st-century Australian women politicians
Women members of the Queensland Legislative Assembly
People from East Melbourne
People educated at Genazzano FCJ College
Politicians from Melbourne